Kunigami dialect may refer to:
 Eastern Okinoerabu spoken in the community of Kunigami
 Kunigami language

See also
Ryukyuan languages
Northern Ryukyuan languages

Language and nationality disambiguation pages